Renal glucose reabsorption is the part of kidney (renal) physiology that deals with the retrieval of filtered glucose, preventing it from disappearing from the body through the urine.

If glucose is not reabsorbed by the kidney, it appears in the urine, in a condition known as glycosuria. This is associated with diabetes mellitus.

Firstly, the glucose in the proximal tubule is co-transported with sodium ions into the proximal convoluted tubule walls via the SGLT2 cotransporter. Some (typically smaller) amino acids are also transported in this way. 
Once in the tubule wall, the glucose and amino acids diffuse directly into the blood capillaries along a concentration gradient. This blood is flowing, so the gradient is maintained. 
Lastly, sodium/potassium ion active transport pumps remove sodium from the tubule wall and the sodium is put back into the blood. This maintains a sodium concentration gradient in the proximal tubule lining, so the first step continues to happen.

Gliflozins such as canagliflozin inhibit renal glucose reabsorption, and are used in diabetes mellitus to lower blood glucose.

Overview table

References

Renal physiology